The Hill of Tara ( or ) is a hill and ancient ceremonial and burial site near Skryne in County Meath,  Ireland. Tradition identifies the hill as the inauguration place and seat of the High Kings of Ireland; it also appears in Irish mythology. Tara consists of numerous monuments and earthworks—dating from the  Neolithic to the Iron Age—including a passage tomb (the "Mound of the Hostages"), burial mounds, round enclosures, a standing stone (believed to be the Lia Fáil or "Stone of Destiny"), and a ceremonial avenue. There is also a church and graveyard on the hill. Tara forms part of a larger ancient landscape and Tara itself is a protected national monument under the care of the Office of Public Works, an agency of the Irish Government.

Name
It is believed this comes from Proto-Celtic  and means a 'sanctuary' or 'sacred space' cut off for ceremony, cognate with the Greek  and Latin . Another suggestion is that it means "a height with a view".

Features and early history

Ancient monuments

The remains of twenty ancient monuments are visible, and at least three times that many have been found through geophysical surveys and aerial photography.

It holds the remains of hundreds of people, most of which are cremated bones. In the Neolithic, it was the communal tomb of a single community for about a century, during which there were almost 300 burials. Almost a millennium later, in the Bronze Age, there were a further 33 burials – first in the passage and then in the mound around it. During this time, only certain high-status individuals were buried there. At first, it was the tomb of one community, but later multiple communities came together to bury their elite there. The last burial was a full body burial of a young man of high status, with an ornate necklace and dagger.

During the late Neolithic or early Bronze Age, a huge double timber circle or "wood henge" was built on the hilltop. It was 250m in diameter and surrounded the Mound of the Hostages. The timber circle was eventually either removed or decayed, and the burial mounds are barely visible today.

There are several large round enclosures on the hill, which were built in the Iron Age. It is dated to the 1st century BC and was originally marked out by a stakewall. Human burials, and a high concentration of horse and dog bones, were found in the ditch. According to legend, the stone would let out a roar when the rightful king touched it. It is believed that the stone originally lay beside or on top of the Mound of the Hostages.

It is a round enclosure with four rings of ditches and banks, and incorporates earlier burial mounds. It was re-modelled several times and once had a large timber building inside it, resembling the one at Navan. It was occupied between the 1st and 4th centuries AD, and Roman artefacts were also found there. It was badly mutilated in the early 20th century by British Israelites searching for the Ark of the Covenant.

The  are burial mounds with ring ditches around them which sit on a slope.

This was likely the ceremonial avenue leading to the hilltop and seems to have been one of the last monuments built.

Half a mile south of the Hill of Tara is another large round enclosure known as Rath Meave, which refers to the legendary figure Medb or Medb Lethderg.

Annals
In the Annals of Inisfallen (AI980.4) is a description of the Battle of Tara between Máel Sechnaill mac Domnaill and the son of Amlaíb Cuarán.

Church
A church, called Saint Patrick's, is on the eastern side of the hilltop. The "Rath of the Synods" has been partly destroyed by its churchyard. The modern church was built in 1822–23 on the site of an earlier one. 

The earliest evidence of a church at Tara is a charter dating from the 1190s. In 1212, this church was "among the possessions confirmed to the Knights Hospitallers of Saint John of Kilmainham by Pope Innocent III". A 1791 illustration shows the church building internally divided into a nave and chancel, with a bell-tower over the western end. A stump of wall marks the site of the old church today, but some of its stonework was re-used in the current church. 

The building is now used as a visitor centre, operated by the Office of Public Works (OPW), an agency of the Irish Government.

The Five Roads of Tara
According to legend, five ancient roads or  meet at Tara, linking it with all the provinces of Ireland. The earliest reference to the five roads of Tara was in the tale  (The Destruction of Da Derga's Hall).

The five roads are said to be:

 , which went west towards Lough Owel, then to Rathcroghan.
 , which went to Slane, then to Navan Fort, ending at Dunseverick.
 , which went through Dublin and through the old district of Cualann towards Waterford.
 , which went towards and through Ossory.
  ('Great Highway'), which roughly followed the Esker Riada to County Galway.

Significance

The passage of the Mound of the Hostages is aligned with the sunrise around the times of Samhain (the Gaelic festival marking the start of winter) and Imbolc (the festival marking the start of spring). The passage is shorter than monuments like Newgrange, making it less precise in providing alignments with the Sun, but Martin Brennan writes in The Stones of Time that "daily changes in the position of a 13-foot long sunbeam are more than adequate to determine specific dates". Early Irish literature records that a royal gathering called the 'feast of Tara' (feis Temro) was held there at Samhain.

By the beginning of Ireland's historical period, Tara had become the seat of a sacral kingship. Historian Dáibhí Ó Cróinín writes that Tara "possessed an aura that seemed to set it above" the other royal seats. It is recorded as the seat of the High King of Ireland (Ard Rí) and is "central to most of the great drama in early Irish literature". Various medieval king lists traced a line of High Kings far into the past. However, John T. Koch explains: "Although the kingship of Tara was a special kingship whose occupants had aspirations towards supremacy among the kings of Ireland, in political terms it is unlikely that any king had sufficient authority to dominate the whole island before the 9th century".

Irish legend says that the Lia Fáil (Stone of Destiny) at Tara was brought to Ireland by the divine Tuatha Dé Danann, and that it would cry out under the foot of the true king. Medb Lethderg was the sovereignty goddess of Tara. The cult of the sacral kingship of Tara is reflected in the legends of High King Conaire Mór, while another legendary High King, Cormac mac Airt, is presented as the ideal king. The reign of Diarmait mac Cerbaill, a historical king of Tara in the sixth century, was seen as particularly important by medieval writers. Although he was probably pagan, he was also influenced by Christian leaders and "stood chronologically between two worlds, the ancient pagan one and the new Christian one".

Tara was probably controlled by the Érainn before it was seized by the Laigin in the third century. Niall of the Nine Hostages displaced the Laigin from Tara in the fifth century and it became the ceremonial seat of the Uí Néill. The kingship of Tara alternated between the Southern and Northern Uí Néill until the eleventh century. After this, control of Dublin, Limerick, and Waterford became more important to a would-be High King than control of Tara.

According to Irish mythology, during the third century a great battle known as the Cath Gabhra took place between High King Cairbre Lifechair, and the Fianna led by Fionn Mac Cumhaill. The Fianna were heavily defeated; many of the graves of the Fianna covered the Rath of the Gabhra, most notably the grave of Oscar, son of Oisín.

Later history

In 1843, the Irish nationalist leader Daniel O'Connell hosted a peaceful political demonstration at Tara in favour of Irish self-governance which drew over 750,000 people, highlighting the lasting significance of Tara.

British Prime Minister John Russell inherited the Tara estate during the 19th century. At the turn of the 20th century, Tara was vandalised by British Israelists who thought that the British were part of the Lost Tribes of Israel and that the hill contained the Ark of the Covenant. A group of British Israelists, led by retired Anglo-Indian judge Edward Wheeler Bird, set about excavating the site having paid off the landowner, Gustavus Villiers Briscoe. Irish cultural nationalists held a mass protest over the destruction of the national heritage site, including Douglas Hyde, Arthur Griffith, Maud Gonne, George Moore and W. B. Yeats. Hyde tried to interrupt the dig but was ordered away by a man wielding a rifle. Maud Gonne made a more flamboyant protest by relighting an old bonfire that Briscoe had lit to celebrate the coronation of Edward VII. She began to sing Thomas Davis's song "A Nation Once Again" by the fire, much to the consternation of the landlord and the police.

The Irish government bought the southern part of the hill in 1952, and the northern part in  1972.

The religious order Missionary Society of St. Columban had its international headquarters at Dalgan Park, just north of the Hill of Tara. The order was named after the Saint who was born in the Ancient Kingdom of Meath. The land Dalgan Park lies on was once owned by the kings of Tara.

Motorway development

The M3 motorway passes through the Tara-Skryne Valley – as did the existing N3 road. Protesters argue that since the Tara Discovery Programme started in 1992, there is an appreciation that the Hill of Tara is just the central complex of a wider landscape. The distance between the motorway and the hill is  – it intersects the old N3 at the Blundelstown interchange between the Hill of Tara and the Hill of Skryne.
On Sunday 23 September 2007 over 1500 people met on the Hill of Tara to take part in a human sculpture representing a harp and spelling out the words "SAVE TARA VALLEY" as a call for the re-routing of the M3 motorway away from Tara. Actors Stuart Townsend and Jonathan Rhys Meyers attended this event. There was also a letter writing campaign to preserve the Hill of Tara.  

The Hill of Tara was included in the World Monuments Fund's 2008 Watch List of the 100 Most Endangered Sites in the world. The following year it was included in a list of the 15 must-see endangered cultural treasures by the Smithsonian Institution.

The motorway project proceeded, and the road was opened in June 2010.

Gallery

See also
, historic residence of Swedish kings of the legendary Yngling dynasty

, c. 7th century AD pennanular brooch named after, but not from Tara
, Book of Psalms, discovered 2006
, Close to Tara is the Hill of Ward, it's associated with the mythological druidess Tlachtga
, a druidic site associated with the festival of Bealtaine

References

Sources

Further reading

, alt link 
, alt link

External links

Hill of Tara at Megalithic Ireland
Aerial photos of the monuments
Heritage of Ireland, Tara
Boyne Valley Tourist Portal – Information on Tara
The Hill of Tara page on Mythical Ireland

Prehistoric sites in Ireland
Archaeological sites in County Meath
Mountains and hills of County Meath
Tourist attractions in County Meath
National Monuments in County Meath
Royal sites of Ireland
Former populated places in Ireland
Sacred mountains
Irish legends